Yugoslav Social-Democratic Party or JSDS was a socialist political party in Slovenia and Istria during the Austro-Hungarian Empire and the Kingdom of Yugoslavia. It was founded in 1898 in Trieste.

In 1909 the party issued its 'Tivoli resolution', calling for the cultural and political unification of all South Slavs. However, the party also worked for limited Slovenian autonomy at the times of the Constituent Assembly. Its long-term goal was ending the oppressive capitalist system in favour of a more equal one, but it also pursued smaller goals of helping the working class, democratisation of political life, equal and general voting rights etc.

JSDS founded many syndicates and workers' cooperatives. It also supported and organised general strikes in Trieste, Jesenice, Hrastnik, Trbovlje etc. Although the party did not address farmers and although a lot of workers were snatched by the liberals and conservative catholic parties, JSDS grew in strength and scope. After the men's general voting right was passed in Austria-Hungary, the Yugoslav Social-Democratic Party was an important and undismissable political force.

Organs
On March 18, 1898, the party organ Rdeči prapor (Red Flag) began publishing in Trieste.  Josip Zavertanik and Josip Kopač were its main editors. On October 20, 1905, the editorial office shifted to Ljubljana. Zarja (Dawn) was founded in 1911 as a party organ. In 1914 the newspaper shifted to Trieste, and ceased to be an official party organ.

Legacy
Between 1990 and 2002, the Social Democratic Party of Slovenia regarded itself as the moral and spiritual heir of the Yugoslav Social Democratic Party.

Prominent members 
Etbin Kristan
Josip Ferfolja
Ivan Cankar
Dragotin Lončar
Albin Prepeluh

References

1898 establishments in Austria-Hungary
Banned socialist parties
Defunct political parties in Slovenia
Defunct socialist parties in Europe
Political parties established in 1898
Political parties in Austria-Hungary
Political parties in the Kingdom of Yugoslavia
Political parties with year of disestablishment missing
Social democratic parties in Slovenia
Yugoslavism